Tsakhir is a sum (district) of Arkhangai Province in central Mongolia. In 2009, its population was 2,143.

Tsakhir sum lies on the extreme western edge of the aimag. On the east, it borders the sums Tariat to the north and the Khangai to the south.  The western border is adjacent to Zavkhan Aimag. To the north is the Khövsgöl Aimag, and to the south the Bayankhongor Aimag.

Notable people
Radnaasümbereliin Gonchigdorj (born 1953) - Mongolian Social Democratic Party politician.

References

Populated places in Mongolia
Districts of Arkhangai Province